Elkhorn is an outdoor 1979 sculpture by Lee Kelly, installed at Catlin Gabel School in West Haven-Sylvan, a census-designated place in Washington County and the Portland metropolitan area, in the U.S. state of Oregon.

Description
Lee Kelly's Elkhorn is a welded Cor-Ten steel sculpture installed west of Toad Hall at Catlin Gabel School in West Haven-Sylvan, Oregon. It was designed in 1978, the year his son with Bonnie Bronson, Jason, died of leukemia. The sculpture was commissioned by Kelly's friends, and dedicated in 1979 in his son's memory. The abstract, geometric work depicts a deer and features a three rectangular legs supporting a rectangular platform, with another rectangular shape suspended underneath the platform. It measures approximately  x  x . The sculpture's north leg has an inscription that reads  and a plaque with the text, .

The sculpture is administered by Catlin Gabel School. It was surveyed and deemed "treatment needed" by the Smithsonian Institution's "Save Outdoor Sculpture!" program in November 1993.

See also

 1979 in art

References

1979 establishments in Oregon
1979 sculptures
Abstract sculptures in Oregon
Animal sculptures in Oregon
Deer in art
Monuments and memorials in Portland, Oregon
Outdoor sculptures in Oregon
Sculptures by Lee Kelly
Statues in Oregon
Steel sculptures in Oregon
West Haven-Sylvan, Oregon